Juraj Szikora (2 March 1947 – 12 December 2005) was a Slovak football player, of Hungarian ethnic origin. He played for Czechoslovakia.

References 
 Profile at ČMFS official website

1945 births
2005 deaths
People from Nové Zámky District
Sportspeople from the Nitra Region
Czechoslovak footballers
Czechoslovakia international footballers
Slovak footballers
Slovak football managers
FK Inter Bratislava players
FC DAC 1904 Dunajská Streda players
FC Nitra managers
FC DAC 1904 Dunajská Streda managers
Association football forwards
Association football midfielders